Brendan Berne is an Australian civil servant and diplomat who served as the Australian Ambassador to France, Algeria, Mauritania, and Monaco between July 2017 to October 2020. 

He previously served as Chief of Staff for the Minister for Trade, Tourism and Investment. His career has spanned postings within the Department of Foreign Affairs and Trade, and the Reserve Bank of Australia. In December 2017, following the legalisation of same-sex marriage in Australia, he proposed to his partner of 11 years. A video of the proposal went viral in France.

He retired from the Department of Foreign Affairs and Trade following his post as Australian Ambassador to France and is writing a TV comedy about the diplomatic circuit described as “In the Thick of It in a safari suit”.

References 

  

Year of birth missing (living people)
Living people
Ambassadors of Australia for Asia-Pacific Economic Cooperation
Ambassadors of Australia to France
Ambassadors of Australia to Algeria
Ambassadors of Australia to Mauritania
Ambassadors of Australia to Monaco